Kanglish (Kannada: ಕಂಗ್ಲಿಷ್) is a macaronic language of Kannada and English.

The name is a portmanteau of the names of the two languages and was first recorded earliest in 1993. Other less common terms are Kannalish (recorded from 2000), Kannadlish (2006) and Kanlish (2009). 

At present in Karnataka,  almost all urban people and some rural people talk in this language. This language is result of communication of English and Kannadigas.

Examples
En sir samachara? : whats the matter sir?

Hello, tiffin aytha? : Hello, have you had your tiffin?

Swalpa move madi : Just move a bit.

Swalpa brake haki : Please apply the brakes.

Yav movie hakiddare? : Which movie is playing?

Een documentary nodtaiddira? : What documentary are you watching?

Een kelsa madtaiddira computardu wordalli? : What work are you doing in Word?

References

Macaronic language
English language
Kannada language